Concrete is a composite material composed of fine and coarse aggregate bonded together with a fluid cement (cement paste) that hardens (cures) over time. Concrete is the second-most-used substance in the world after water, and is the most widely used building material. Its usage worldwide, ton for ton, is twice that of steel, wood, plastics, and aluminium combined. Globally, the ready-mix concrete industry, the largest segment of the concrete market, is projected to exceed $600 billion in revenue by 2025. This widespread use results in a number of environmental impacts. Most notably, the production process for cement produces large volumes of greenhouse gas emissions, leading to net 8% of global emissions. Other environmental concerns include widespread illegal sand mining, impacts on the surrounding environment such as increased surface runoff or urban heat island effect, and potential public health implications from toxic ingredients. Significant research and development is being done to try to reduce the emissions or make concrete a source of carbon sequestration, and increase recycled and secondary raw materials content into the mix to achieve a circular economy. Concrete is expected to be a key material for structures resilient to climate disasters, as well as a solution to mitigate the pollution of other industries, capturing wastes such as coal fly ash or bauxite tailings and residue.

When aggregate is mixed with dry Portland cement and water, the mixture forms a fluid slurry that is easily poured and molded into shape. The cement reacts with the water through a process called concrete hydration that hardens over several hours to form a hard matrix that binds the materials together into a durable stone-like material that has many uses. This time allows concrete to not only be cast in forms, but also to have a variety of tooled processes preformed. The hydration process is exothermic, which means ambient temperature plays a significant role in how long it takes concrete to set. Often, additives (such as pozzolans or superplasticizers) are included in the mixture to improve the physical properties of the wet mix, delay or accelerate the curing time, or otherwise change the finished material. Most concrete is poured with reinforcing materials (such as rebar) embedded to provide tensile strength, yielding reinforced concrete.

In the past, lime based cement binders, such as lime putty, were often used but sometimes with other hydraulic cements, (water resistant) such as a calcium aluminate cement or with Portland cement to form Portland cement concrete (named for its visual resemblance to Portland stone). Many other non-cementitious types of concrete exist with other methods of binding aggregate together, including asphalt concrete with a bitumen binder, which is frequently used for road surfaces, and polymer concretes that use polymers as a binder. Concrete is distinct from mortar. Whereas concrete is itself a building material, mortar is a bonding agent that typically holds bricks, tiles and other masonry units together.

Etymology 
The word concrete comes from the Latin word "concretus" (meaning compact or condensed), the perfect passive participle of "concrescere", from "con-" (together) and "crescere" (to grow).

History

Ancient times
Mayan concrete at the ruins of Uxmal (850-925 A.D.) is referenced in Incidents of Travel in the Yucatán by John L. Stephens. "The roof is flat and had been covered with cement". "The floors were cement, in some places hard, but, by long exposure, broken, and now crumbling under the feet." "But throughout the wall was solid, and consisting of large stones imbedded in mortar, almost as hard as rock."

Small-scale production of concrete-like materials was pioneered by the Nabatean traders who occupied and controlled a series of oases and developed a small empire in the regions of southern Syria and northern Jordan from the 4th century BC. They discovered the advantages of hydraulic lime, with some self-cementing properties, by 700 BC. They built kilns to supply mortar for the construction of rubble masonry houses, concrete floors, and underground waterproof cisterns. They kept the cisterns secret as these enabled the Nabataeans to thrive in the desert. Some of these structures survive to this day.

Classical era

In the Ancient Egyptian and later Roman eras, builders discovered that adding volcanic ash to the mix allowed it to set underwater.

Concrete floors were found in the royal palace of Tiryns, Greece, which dates roughly to 1400-1200 BC. Lime mortars were used in Greece, Crete, and Cyprus in 800 BC. The Assyrian Jerwan Aqueduct (688 BC) made use of waterproof concrete. Concrete was used for construction in many ancient structures.

The Romans used concrete extensively from 300 BC to 476 AD. During the Roman Empire, Roman concrete (or opus caementicium) was made from quicklime, pozzolana and an aggregate of pumice. Its widespread use in many Roman structures, a key event in the history of architecture termed the Roman architectural revolution, freed Roman construction from the restrictions of stone and brick materials. It enabled revolutionary new designs in terms of both structural complexity and dimension. The Colosseum in Rome was built largely of concrete, and the Pantheon has the world's largest unreinforced concrete dome.

Concrete, as the Romans knew it, was a new and revolutionary material. Laid in the shape of arches, vaults and domes, it quickly hardened into a rigid mass, free from many of the internal thrusts and strains that troubled the builders of similar structures in stone or brick.

Modern tests show that opus caementicium had as much compressive strength as modern Portland-cement concrete (ca. ). However, due to the absence of reinforcement, its tensile strength was far lower than modern reinforced concrete, and its mode of application also differed:

Modern structural concrete differs from Roman concrete in two important details. First, its mix consistency is fluid and homogeneous, allowing it to be poured into forms rather than requiring hand-layering together with the placement of aggregate, which, in Roman practice, often consisted of rubble. Second, integral reinforcing steel gives modern concrete assemblies great strength in tension, whereas Roman concrete could depend only upon the strength of the concrete bonding to resist tension.

The long-term durability of Roman concrete structures has been found to be due to its use of pyroclastic (volcanic) rock and ash, whereby the crystallization of strätlingite (a specific and complex calcium aluminosilicate hydrate) and the coalescence of this and similar calcium–aluminium-silicate–hydrate cementing binders helped give the concrete a greater degree of fracture resistance even in seismically active environments. Roman concrete is significantly more resistant to erosion by seawater than modern concrete; it used pyroclastic materials which react with seawater to form Al-tobermorite crystals over time.

The widespread use of concrete in many Roman structures ensured that many survive to the present day. The Baths of Caracalla in Rome are just one example. Many Roman aqueducts and bridges, such as the magnificent Pont du Gard in southern France, have masonry cladding on a concrete core, as does the dome of the Pantheon.

Middle Ages
After the Roman Empire, the use of burned lime and pozzolana was greatly reduced. Low kiln temperatures in the burning of lime, lack of pozzolana, and poor mixing all contributed to a decline in the quality of concrete and mortar. From the 11th century, the increased use of stone in church and castle construction led to an increased demand for mortar. Quality began to improve in the 12th century through better grinding and sieving. Medieval lime mortars and concretes were non-hydraulic and were used for binding masonry, "hearting" (binding rubble masonry cores) and foundations. Bartholomaeus Anglicus in his De proprietatibus rerum (1240) describes the making of mortar. In an English translation from 1397, it reads "lyme ... is a stone brent; by medlynge thereof with sonde and water sement is made". From the 14th century, the quality of mortar was again excellent, but only from the 17th century was pozzolana commonly added.

The Canal du Midi was built using concrete in 1670.

Industrial era

Perhaps the greatest step forward in the modern use of concrete was Smeaton's Tower, built by British engineer John Smeaton in Devon, England, between 1756 and 1759. This third Eddystone Lighthouse pioneered the use of hydraulic lime in concrete, using pebbles and powdered brick as aggregate.

A method for producing Portland cement was developed in England and patented by Joseph Aspdin in 1824. Aspdin chose the name for its similarity to Portland stone, which was quarried on the Isle of Portland in Dorset, England. His son William continued developments into the 1840s, earning him recognition for the development of "modern" Portland cement.

Reinforced concrete was invented in 1849 by Joseph Monier. and the first reinforced concrete house was built by François Coignet in 1853.
The first concrete reinforced bridge was designed and built by Joseph Monier in 1875.

Composition
Concrete is an artificial composite material, comprising a matrix of cementitious binder (typically Portland cement paste or asphalt) and a dispersed phase or "filler" of aggregate (typically a rocky material, loose stones, and sand).  The binder "glues" the filler together to form a synthetic conglomerate. Many types of concrete are available, determined by the formulations of binders and the types of aggregate used to suit the application of the engineered material. These variables determine strength and density, as well as chemical and thermal resistance of the finished product.

Aggregates consist of large chunks of material in a concrete mix, generally a coarse gravel or crushed rocks such as limestone, or granite, along with finer materials such as sand.

Cement paste, most commonly made of Portland cement, is the most prevalent kind of concrete binder. For cementitious binders, water is mixed with the dry cement powder and aggregate, which produces a semi-liquid slurry (paste) that can be shaped, typically by pouring it into a form. The concrete solidifies and hardens through a chemical process called hydration. The water reacts with the cement, which bonds the other components together, creating a robust, stone-like material. Other cementitious materials, such as fly ash and slag cement, are sometimes added—either pre-blended with the cement or directly as a concrete component—and become a part of the binder for the aggregate. Fly ash and slag can enhance some properties of concrete such as fresh properties and durability. Alternatively, other materials can also be used as a concrete binder: the most prevalent substitute is asphalt, which is used as the binder in asphalt concrete.

Admixtures are added to modify the cure rate or properties of the material. Mineral admixtures use recycled materials as concrete ingredients. Conspicuous materials include fly ash, a by-product of coal-fired power plants; ground granulated blast furnace slag, a by-product of steelmaking; and silica fume, a by-product of industrial electric arc furnaces.

Structures employing Portland cement concrete usually include steel reinforcement because this type of concrete can be formulated with high compressive strength, but always has lower tensile strength. Therefore, it is usually reinforced with materials that are strong in tension, typically steel rebar.

The mix design depends on the type of structure being built, how the concrete is mixed and delivered, and how it is placed to form the structure.

Cement

Portland cement is the most common type of cement in general usage. It is a basic ingredient of concrete, mortar, and many plasters. British masonry worker Joseph Aspdin patented Portland cement in 1824. It was named because of the similarity of its color to Portland limestone, quarried from the English Isle of Portland and used extensively in London architecture. It consists of a mixture of calcium silicates (alite, belite), aluminates and ferrites—compounds which combine calcium, silicon, aluminium and iron in forms which will react with water. Portland cement and similar materials are made by heating limestone (a source of calcium) with clay or shale (a source of silicon, aluminium and iron) and grinding this product (called clinker) with a source of sulfate (most commonly gypsum).

In modern cement kilns, many advanced features are used to lower the fuel consumption per ton of clinker produced. Cement kilns are extremely large, complex, and inherently dusty industrial installations, and have emissions which must be controlled. Of the various ingredients used to produce a given quantity of concrete, the cement is the most energetically expensive. Even complex and efficient kilns require 3.3 to 3.6 gigajoules of energy to produce a ton of clinker and then grind it into cement. Many kilns can be fueled with difficult-to-dispose-of wastes, the most common being used tires. The extremely high temperatures and long periods of time at those temperatures allows cement kilns to efficiently and completely burn even difficult-to-use fuels.

Water
Combining water with a cementitious material forms a cement paste by the process of hydration. The cement paste glues the aggregate together, fills voids within it, and makes it flow more freely.

As stated by Abrams' law, a lower water-to-cement ratio yields a stronger, more durable concrete, whereas more water gives a freer-flowing concrete with a higher slump. Impure water used to make concrete can cause problems when setting or in causing premature failure of the structure.

Portland cement consists of five major compounds of calcium silicates and alumninates ranging from 5 to 50% in weight, which all undergo hydration to contribute to final material's strength. Thus, the hydration of cement involves many reactions, often occurring at the same time. As the reactions proceed, the products of the cement hydration process gradually bond together the individual sand and gravel particles and other components of the concrete to form a solid mass.

Hydration of tricalcium silicate 
Cement chemist notation: C3S + H → C-S-H + CH + heat
Standard notation: Ca3SiO5 + H2O → (CaO)·(SiO2)·(H2O)(gel) + Ca(OH)2
Balanced: 2Ca3SiO5 + 7H2O → 3(CaO)·2(SiO2)·4(H2O)(gel) + 3Ca(OH)2 (approximately; the exact ratios of the CaO, SiO2 and H2O in C-S-H can vary)

Due to the nature of the chemical bonds created in these reactions and the final characteristics of the particles formed, the process of cement hydration is considered irreversible, which makes methods of cement recycling prohibitive.

Aggregates

Fine and coarse aggregates make up the bulk of a concrete mixture. Sand, natural gravel, and crushed stone are used mainly for this purpose. Recycled aggregates (from construction, demolition, and excavation waste) are increasingly used as partial replacements for natural aggregates, while a number of manufactured aggregates, including air-cooled blast furnace slag and bottom ash are also permitted.

The size distribution of the aggregate determines how much binder is required. Aggregate with a very even size distribution has the biggest gaps whereas adding aggregate with smaller particles tends to fill these gaps. The binder must fill the gaps between the aggregate as well as paste the surfaces of the aggregate together, and is typically the most expensive component. Thus, variation in sizes of the aggregate reduces the cost of concrete. The aggregate is nearly always stronger than the binder, so its use does not negatively affect the strength of the concrete.

Redistribution of aggregates after compaction often creates non-homogeneity due to the influence of vibration. This can lead to strength gradients.

Decorative stones such as quartzite, small river stones or crushed glass are sometimes added to the surface of concrete for a decorative "exposed aggregate" finish, popular among landscape designers.

Admixtures
Admixtures are materials in the form of powder or fluids that are added to the concrete to give it certain characteristics not obtainable with plain concrete mixes. Admixtures are defined as additions "made as the concrete mix is being prepared". The most common admixtures are retarders and accelerators. In normal use, admixture dosages are less than 5% by mass of cement and are added to the concrete at the time of batching/mixing. The common types of admixtures are as follows:
 Accelerators speed up the hydration (hardening) of the concrete. Typical materials used are calcium chloride, calcium nitrate and sodium nitrate. However, use of chlorides may cause corrosion in steel reinforcing and is prohibited in some countries, so that nitrates may be favored, even though they are less effective than the chloride salt. Accelerating admixtures are especially useful for modifying the properties of concrete in cold weather.
 Air entraining agents add and entrain tiny air bubbles in the concrete, which reduces damage during freeze-thaw cycles, increasing durability. However, entrained air entails a tradeoff with strength, as each 1% of air may decrease compressive strength by 5%. If too much air becomes trapped in the concrete as a result of the mixing process, defoamers can be used to encourage the air bubble to agglomerate, rise to the surface of the wet concrete and then disperse.
 Bonding agents are used to create a bond between old and new concrete (typically a type of polymer) with wide temperature tolerance and corrosion resistance.
 Corrosion inhibitors are used to minimize the corrosion of steel and steel bars in concrete.
 Crystalline admixtures are typically added during batching of the concrete to lower permeability. The reaction takes place when exposed to water and un-hydrated cement particles to form insoluble needle-shaped crystals, which fill capillary pores and micro-cracks in the concrete to block pathways for water and waterborne contaminates. Concrete with crystalline admixture can expect to self-seal as constant exposure to water will continuously initiate crystallization to ensure permanent waterproof protection.
 Pigments can be used to change the color of concrete, for aesthetics.
 Plasticizers increase the workability of plastic, or "fresh", concrete, allowing it to be placed more easily, with less consolidating effort. A typical plasticizer is lignosulfonate. Plasticizers can be used to reduce the water content of a concrete while maintaining workability and are sometimes called water-reducers due to this use. Such treatment improves its strength and durability characteristics.
 Superplasticizers (also called high-range water-reducers) are a class of plasticizers that have fewer deleterious effects and can be used to increase workability more than is practical with traditional plasticizers. Superplasticizers are used to increase compressive strength. It increases the workability of the concrete and lowers the need for water content by 15–30%. 
 Pumping aids improve pumpability, thicken the paste and reduce separation and bleeding.
 Retarders slow the hydration of concrete and are used in large or difficult pours where partial setting is undesirable before completion of the pour. Typical polyol retarders are sugar, sucrose, sodium gluconate, glucose, citric acid, and tartaric acid.

Mineral admixtures and blended cements

Inorganic materials that have pozzolanic or latent hydraulic properties, these very fine-grained materials are added to the concrete mix to improve the properties of concrete (mineral admixtures), or as a replacement for Portland cement (blended cements). Products which incorporate limestone, fly ash, blast furnace slag, and other useful materials with pozzolanic properties into the mix, are being tested and used. These developments are ever growing in relevance to minimize the impacts caused by cement use, notorious for being one of the largest producers (at about 5 to 10%) of global greenhouse gas emissions. The use of alternative materials also is capable of lowering costs, improving concrete properties, and recycling wastes, the latest being relevant for circular economy aspects of the construction industry, whose demand is ever growing with greater impacts on raw material extraction, waste generation and landfill practices.
 Fly ash: A by-product of coal-fired electric generating plants, it is used to partially replace Portland cement (by up to 60% by mass). The properties of fly ash depend on the type of coal burnt. In general, siliceous fly ash is pozzolanic, while calcareous fly ash has latent hydraulic properties.
 Ground granulated blast furnace slag (GGBFS or GGBS): A by-product of steel production is used to partially replace Portland cement (by up to 80% by mass). It has latent hydraulic properties.
 Silica fume: A by-product of the production of silicon and ferrosilicon alloys. Silica fume is similar to fly ash, but has a particle size 100 times smaller. This results in a higher surface-to-volume ratio and a much faster pozzolanic reaction. Silica fume is used to increase strength and durability of concrete, but generally requires the use of superplasticizers for workability.
 High reactivity metakaolin (HRM): Metakaolin produces concrete with strength and durability similar to concrete made with silica fume. While silica fume is usually dark gray or black in color, high-reactivity metakaolin is usually bright white in color, making it the preferred choice for architectural concrete where appearance is important.
 Carbon nanofibers can be added to concrete to enhance compressive strength and gain a higher Young's modulus, and also to improve the electrical properties required for strain monitoring, damage evaluation and self-health monitoring of concrete. Carbon fiber has many advantages in terms of mechanical and electrical properties (e.g., higher strength) and self-monitoring behavior due to the high tensile strength and high electrical conductivity.
 Carbon products have been added to make concrete electrically conductive, for deicing purposes.

Production

Concrete production is the process of mixing together the various ingredients—water, aggregate, cement, and any additives—to produce concrete. Concrete production is time-sensitive. Once the ingredients are mixed, workers must put the concrete in place before it hardens. In modern usage, most concrete production takes place in a large type of industrial facility called a concrete plant, or often a batch plant.

In general usage, concrete plants come in two main types, ready mix plants and central mix plants. A ready-mix plant mixes all the ingredients except water, while a central mix plant mixes all the ingredients including water. A central-mix plant offers more accurate control of the concrete quality through better measurements of the amount of water added, but must be placed closer to the work site where the concrete will be used, since hydration begins at the plant.

A concrete plant consists of large storage hoppers for various reactive ingredients like cement, storage for bulk ingredients like aggregate and water, mechanisms for the addition of various additives and amendments, machinery to accurately weigh, move, and mix some or all of those ingredients, and facilities to dispense the mixed concrete, often to a concrete mixer truck.

Modern concrete is usually prepared as a viscous fluid, so that it may be poured into forms, which are containers erected in the field to give the concrete its desired shape. Concrete formwork can be prepared in several ways, such as slip forming and steel plate construction. Alternatively, concrete can be mixed into dryer, non-fluid forms and used in factory settings to manufacture precast concrete products.

A wide variety of equipment is used for processing concrete, from hand tools to heavy industrial machinery. Whichever equipment builders use, however, the objective is to produce the desired building material; ingredients must be properly mixed, placed, shaped, and retained within time constraints. Any interruption in pouring the concrete can cause the initially placed material to begin to set before the next batch is added on top. This creates a horizontal plane of weakness called a cold joint between the two batches. Once the mix is where it should be, the curing process must be controlled to ensure that the concrete attains the desired attributes. During concrete preparation, various technical details may affect the quality and nature of the product.

Design mix
Design mix ratios are decided by an engineer after analyzing the properties of the specific ingredients being used. Instead of using a 'nominal mix' of 1 part cement, 2 parts sand, and 4 parts aggregate (the second example from above), a civil engineer will custom-design a concrete mix to exactly meet the requirements of the site and conditions, setting material ratios and often designing an admixture package to fine-tune the properties or increase the performance envelope of the mix. Design-mix concrete can have very broad specifications that cannot be met with more basic nominal mixes, but the involvement of the engineer often increases the cost of the concrete mix.

Concrete Mixes are primarily divided into nominal mix, standard mix and design mix.

Nominal mixes are a simple, fast way of getting a basic idea of the properties of the finished concrete without having to perform testing in advance.

Various governing bodies (such as British Standards) define nominal mix ratios into a number of grades, usually ranging from lower compressive strength to higher compressive strength. The grades usually indicate the 28-day cube strength.

Mixing

Thorough mixing is essential to produce uniform, high-quality concrete.

 has shown that the mixing of cement and water into a paste before combining these materials with aggregates can increase the compressive strength of the resulting concrete. The cement paste premix may include admixtures such as accelerators or retarders, superplasticizers, pigments, or silica fume. The premixed paste is then blended with aggregates and any remaining batch water and final mixing is completed in conventional concrete mixing equipment.

Sample analysis – Workability

Workability is the ability of a fresh (plastic) concrete mix to fill the form/mold properly with the desired work (pouring, pumping, spreading, tamping, vibration) and without reducing the concrete's quality. Workability depends on water content, aggregate (shape and size distribution), cementitious content and age (level of hydration) and can be modified by adding chemical admixtures, like superplasticizer. Raising the water content or adding chemical admixtures increases concrete workability. Excessive water leads to increased bleeding or segregation of aggregates (when the cement and aggregates start to separate), with the resulting concrete having reduced quality. Changes in gradation can also affect workability of the concrete, although a wide range of gradation can be used for various applications. An undesirable gradation can mean using a large aggregate that is too large for the size of the formwork, or which has too few smaller aggregate grades to serve to fill the gaps between the larger grades, or using too little or too much sand for the same reason, or using too little water, or too much cement, or even using jagged crushed stone instead of smoother round aggregate such as pebbles. Any combination of these factors and others may result in a mix which is too harsh, i.e., which does not flow or spread out smoothly, is difficult to get into the formwork, and which is difficult to surface finish.

Workability can be measured by the concrete slump test, a simple measure of the plasticity of a fresh batch of concrete following the ASTM C 143 or EN 12350-2 test standards. Slump is normally measured by filling an "Abrams cone" with a sample from a fresh batch of concrete. The cone is placed with the wide end down onto a level, non-absorptive surface. It is then filled in three layers of equal volume, with each layer being tamped with a steel rod to consolidate the layer. When the cone is carefully lifted off, the enclosed material slumps a certain amount, owing to gravity. A relatively wet concrete sample may slump as much as eight inches. Workability can also be measured by the flow table test.

Slump can be increased by addition of chemical admixtures such as plasticizer or superplasticizer without changing the water-cement ratio. Some other admixtures, especially air-entraining admixture, can increase the slump of a mix.

High-flow concrete, like self-consolidating concrete, is tested by other flow-measuring methods. One of these methods includes placing the cone on the narrow end and observing how the mix flows through the cone while it is gradually lifted.

After mixing, concrete is a fluid and can be pumped to the location where needed.

Curing

Concrete must be kept moist during curing in order to achieve optimal strength and durability. During curing hydration occurs, allowing calcium-silicate hydrate (Ca-S-H) to form. Over 90% of a mix's final strength is typically reached within four weeks, with the remaining 10% achieved over years or even decades. The conversion of calcium hydroxide in the concrete into calcium carbonate from absorption of CO2 over several decades further strengthens the concrete and makes it more resistant to damage. This carbonation reaction, however, lowers the pH of the cement pore solution and can corrode the reinforcement bars.

Hydration and hardening of concrete during the first three days is critical. Abnormally fast drying and shrinkage due to factors such as evaporation from wind during placement may lead to increased tensile stresses at a time when it has not yet gained sufficient strength, resulting in greater shrinkage cracking. The early strength of the concrete can be increased if it is kept damp during the curing process. Minimizing stress prior to curing minimizes cracking. High-early-strength concrete is designed to hydrate faster, often by increased use of cement that increases shrinkage and cracking. The strength of concrete changes (increases) for up to three years. It depends on cross-section dimension of elements and conditions of structure exploitation. Addition of short-cut polymer fibers can improve (reduce) shrinkage-induced stresses during curing and increase early and ultimate compression strength.

Properly curing concrete leads to increased strength and lower permeability and avoids cracking where the surface dries out prematurely. Care must also be taken to avoid freezing or overheating due to the exothermic setting of cement. Improper curing can cause scaling, reduced strength, poor abrasion resistance and cracking.

Techniques
During the curing period, concrete is ideally maintained at controlled temperature and humidity. To ensure full hydration during curing, concrete slabs are often sprayed with "curing compounds" that create a water-retaining film over the concrete. Typical films are made of wax or related hydrophobic compounds. After the concrete is sufficiently cured, the film is allowed to abrade from the concrete through normal use.

Traditional conditions for curing involve spraying or ponding the concrete surface with water. The adjacent picture shows one of many ways to achieve this, ponding—submerging setting concrete in water and wrapping in plastic to prevent dehydration. Additional common curing methods include wet burlap and plastic sheeting covering the fresh concrete.

For higher-strength applications, accelerated curing techniques may be applied to the concrete. A common technique involves heating the poured concrete with steam, which serves to both keep it damp and raise the temperature so that the hydration process proceeds more quickly and more thoroughly.

Alternative types

Asphalt

Asphalt concrete (commonly called asphalt, blacktop, or pavement in North America, and tarmac, bitumen macadam, or rolled asphalt in the United Kingdom and the Republic of Ireland) is a composite material commonly used to surface roads, parking lots, airports, as well as the core of embankment dams. Asphalt mixtures have been used in pavement construction since the beginning of the twentieth century. It consists of mineral aggregate bound together with asphalt, laid in layers, and compacted. The process was refined and enhanced by Belgian inventor and U.S. immigrant Edward De Smedt.

The terms asphalt (or asphaltic) concrete, bituminous asphalt concrete, and bituminous mixture are typically used only in engineering and construction documents, which define concrete as any composite material composed of mineral aggregate adhered with a binder. The abbreviation, AC, is sometimes used for asphalt concrete but can also denote asphalt content or asphalt cement, referring to the liquid asphalt portion of the composite material.

Graphene enhanced concrete 

Graphene enhanced concretes are standard designs of concrete mixes, except that during the cement-mixing or production process, a small amount of chemically engineered graphene  is added. These enhanced graphene concretes are designed around the concrete application.

Microbial 
Bacteria such as Bacillus pasteurii, Bacillus pseudofirmus, Bacillus cohnii, Sporosarcina pasteuri, and Arthrobacter crystallopoietes increase the compression strength of concrete through their biomass. However some forms of bacteria can also be concrete-destroying.  Bacillus sp. CT-5. can reduce corrosion of reinforcement in reinforced concrete by up to four times. Sporosarcina pasteurii reduces water and chloride permeability. B. pasteurii increases resistance to acid.  Bacillus pasteurii and B. sphaericuscan induce calcium carbonate precipitation in the surface of cracks, adding compression strength.

Nanoconcrete 

Nanoconcrete (also spelled "nano concrete"' or "nano-concrete") is a class of materials that contains Portland cement particles that are no greater than 100 μm and particles of silica no greater than 500 μm, which fill voids that would otherwise occur in normal concrete, thereby substantially increasing the material's strength. It is widely used in foot and highway bridges where high flexural and compressive strength are indicated.

Pervious 

Pervious concrete is a mix of specially graded coarse aggregate, cement, water, and little-to-no fine aggregates. This concrete is also known as "no-fines" or porous concrete. Mixing the ingredients in a carefully controlled process creates a paste that coats and bonds the aggregate particles. The hardened concrete contains interconnected air voids totaling approximately 15 to 25 percent. Water runs through the voids in the pavement to the soil underneath. Air entrainment admixtures are often used in freeze-thaw climates to minimize the possibility of frost damage. Pervious concrete also permits rainwater to filter through roads and parking lots, to recharge aquifers, instead of contributing to runoff and flooding.

Polymer 

Polymer concretes are mixtures of aggregate and any of various polymers and may be reinforced. The cement is costlier than lime-based cements, but polymer concretes nevertheless have advantages; they have significant tensile strength even without reinforcement, and they are largely impervious to water. Polymer concretes are frequently used for the repair and construction of other applications, such as drains.

Volcanic 
Volcanic concrete substitutes volcanic rock for the limestone that is burned to form clinker. It consumes a similar amount of energy, but does not directly emit carbon as a byproduct. Volcanic rock/ash are used as supplementary cementitious materials in concrete to improve the resistance to sulfate, chloride and alkali silica reaction due to pore refinement. Also, they are generally cost effective in comparison to other aggregates, good for semi and light weight concretes, and good for thermal and acoustic insulation.

Pyroclastic materials, such as pumice, scoria, and ashes are formed from cooling magma during explosive volcanic eruptions. They are used as supplementary cementitious materials (SCM) or as aggregates for cements and concretes. They have been extensively used since ancient times to produce materials for building applications. For example, pumice and other volcanic glasses were added as a natural pozzolanic material for mortars and plasters during the construction of the Villa San Marco in the Roman period (89 BC – 79 AD), which remain one of the best-preserved otium villae of the Bay of Naples in Italy.

Waste light

Waste light is form of polymer modified concrete. The specific polymer admixture allows the replacement of all the traditional aggregates (gravel, sand, stone) by any mixture of solid waste materials in the grain size of 3–10 mm to form a low-compressive-strength (3–20 N/mm2) product  for road and building construction. One cubic meter of waste light concrete contains 1.1–1.3 m3 of shredded waste and no other aggregates.

Sulfur concrete 

Sulfur concrete is a special concrete that uses sulfur as a binder and does not require cement or water.

Properties

Concrete has relatively high compressive strength, but much lower tensile strength. Therefore, it is usually reinforced with materials that are strong in tension (often steel). The elasticity of concrete is relatively constant at low stress levels but starts decreasing at higher stress levels as matrix cracking develops. Concrete has a very low coefficient of thermal expansion and shrinks as it matures. All concrete structures crack to some extent, due to shrinkage and tension. Concrete that is subjected to long-duration forces is prone to creep.

Tests can be performed to ensure that the properties of concrete correspond to specifications for the application.

The ingredients affect the strengths of the material. Concrete strength values are usually specified as the lower-bound compressive strength of either a cylindrical or cubic specimen as determined by standard test procedures.

The strengths of concrete is dictated by its function. Very low-strength— or less—concrete may be used when the concrete must be lightweight. Lightweight concrete is often achieved by adding air, foams, or lightweight aggregates, with the side effect that the strength is reduced. For most routine uses,  concrete is often used.  concrete is readily commercially available as a more durable, although more expensive, option. Higher-strength concrete is often used for larger civil projects. Strengths above  are often used for specific building elements. Bridges may use long beams of high-strength concrete to lower the number of spans required. Occasionally, other structural needs may require high-strength concrete. If a structure must be very rigid, concrete of very high strength may be specified, even much stronger than is required to bear the service loads. Strengths as high as  have been used commercially for these reasons.

Energy efficiency
Energy requirements for transportation of concrete are low because it is produced locally from local resources, typically manufactured within 100 kilometers of the job site. Similarly, relatively little energy is used in producing and combining the raw materials (although large amounts of CO2 are produced by the chemical reactions in cement manufacture). The overall embodied energy of concrete at roughly 1 to 1.5 megajoules per kilogram is therefore lower than for most structural and construction materials.

Once in place, concrete offers great energy efficiency over the lifetime of a building. Concrete walls leak air far less than those made of wood frames. Air leakage accounts for a large percentage of energy loss from a home. The thermal mass properties of concrete increase the efficiency of both residential and commercial buildings. By storing and releasing the energy needed for heating or cooling, concrete's thermal mass delivers year-round benefits by reducing temperature swings inside and minimizing heating and cooling costs. While insulation reduces energy loss through the building envelope, thermal mass uses walls to store and release energy. Modern concrete wall systems use both external insulation and thermal mass to create an energy-efficient building. Insulating concrete forms (ICFs) are hollow blocks or panels made of either insulating foam or rastra that are stacked to form the shape of the walls of a building and then filled with reinforced concrete to create the structure.

Fire safety

Concrete buildings are more resistant to fire than those constructed using steel frames, since concrete has lower heat conductivity than steel and can thus last longer under the same fire conditions. Concrete is sometimes used as a fire protection for steel frames, for the same effect as above. Concrete as a fire shield, for example Fondu fyre, can also be used in extreme environments like a missile launch pad.

Options for non-combustible construction include floors, ceilings and roofs made of cast-in-place and hollow-core precast concrete. For walls, concrete masonry technology and Insulating Concrete Forms (ICFs) are additional options. ICFs are hollow blocks or panels made of fireproof insulating foam that are stacked to form the shape of the walls of a building and then filled with reinforced concrete to create the structure.

Concrete also provides good resistance against externally applied forces such as high winds, hurricanes, and tornadoes owing to its lateral stiffness, which results in minimal horizontal movement. However, this stiffness can work against certain types of concrete structures, particularly where a relatively higher flexing structure is required to resist more extreme forces.

Earthquake safety
As discussed above, concrete is very strong in compression, but weak in tension. Larger earthquakes can generate very large shear loads on structures. These shear loads subject the structure to both tensile and compressional loads. Concrete structures without reinforcement, like other unreinforced masonry structures, can fail during severe earthquake shaking. Unreinforced masonry structures constitute one of the largest earthquake risks globally. These risks can be reduced through seismic retrofitting of at-risk buildings, (e.g. school buildings in Istanbul, Turkey).

Construction with concrete

Concrete is one of the most durable building materials. It provides superior fire resistance compared with wooden construction and gains strength over time. Structures made of concrete can have a long service life. Concrete is used more than any other artificial material in the world. As of 2006, about 7.5 billion cubic meters of concrete are made each year, more than one cubic meter for every person on Earth.

Reinforced concrete 

The use of reinforcement, in the form of iron was introduced in the 1850s by French industrialist François Coignet, and it was not until the 1880s that German civil engineer G. A. Wayss used steel as reinforcement. Concrete is a relatively brittle material that is strong under compression but less in tension. Plain, unreinforced concrete is unsuitable for many structures as it is relatively poor at withstanding stresses induced by vibrations, wind loading, and so on. Hence, to increase its overall strength, steel rods, wires, mesh or cables can be embedded in concrete before it is set. This reinforcement, often known as rebar, resists tensile forces.

Reinforced concrete (RC) is a versatile composite and one of the most widely used materials in modern construction. It is made up of different constituent materials with very different properties that complement each other. In the case of reinforced concrete, the component materials are almost always concrete and steel. These two materials form a strong bond together and are able to resist a variety of applied forces, effectively acting as a single structural element.

Reinforced concrete can be precast or cast-in-place (in situ) concrete, and is used in a wide range of applications such as; slab, wall, beam, column, foundation, and frame construction. Reinforcement is generally placed in areas of the concrete that are likely to be subject to tension, such as the lower portion of beams. Usually, there is a minimum of 50 mm cover, both above and below the steel reinforcement, to resist spalling and corrosion which can lead to structural instability. Other types of non-steel reinforcement, such as Fibre-reinforced concretes are used for specialized applications, predominately as a means of controlling cracking.

Precast concrete 
Precast concrete is concrete which is cast in one place for use elsewhere and is a mobile material. The largest part of precast production is carried out in the works of specialist suppliers, although in some instances, due to economic and geographical factors, scale of product or difficulty of access, the elements are cast on or adjacent to the construction site. Precasting offers considerable advantages because it is carried out in a controlled environment, protected from the elements, but the downside of this is the contribution to greenhouse gas emission from transportation to the construction site.

Advantages to be achieved by employing precast concrete:
 Preferred dimension schemes exist, with elements of tried and tested designs available from a catalogue.
 Major savings in time result from manufacture of structural elements apart from the series of events which determine overall duration of the construction, known by planning engineers as the 'critical path'.
 Availability of Laboratory facilities capable of the required control tests, many being certified for specific testing in accordance with National Standards.
 Equipment with capability suited to specific types of production such as stressing beds with appropriate capacity, moulds and machinery dedicated to particular products.
 High-quality finishes achieved direct from the mould eliminate the need for interior decoration and ensure low maintenance costs.

Mass structures

Due to cement's exothermic chemical reaction while setting up, large concrete structures such as dams, navigation locks, large mat foundations, and large breakwaters generate excessive heat during hydration and associated expansion. To mitigate these effects, post-cooling is commonly applied during construction. An early example at Hoover Dam used a network of pipes between vertical concrete placements to circulate cooling water during the curing process to avoid damaging overheating. Similar systems are still used; depending on volume of the pour, the concrete mix used, and ambient air temperature, the cooling process may last for many months after the concrete is placed. Various methods also are used to pre-cool the concrete mix in mass concrete structures.

Another approach to mass concrete structures that minimizes cement's thermal by-product is the use of roller-compacted concrete, which uses a dry mix which has a much lower cooling requirement than conventional wet placement. It is deposited in thick layers as a semi-dry material then roller compacted into a dense, strong mass.

Surface finishes

Raw concrete surfaces tend to be porous and have a relatively uninteresting appearance. Many finishes can be applied to improve the appearance and preserve the surface against staining, water penetration, and freezing.

Examples of improved appearance include stamped concrete where the wet concrete has a pattern impressed on the surface, to give a paved, cobbled or brick-like effect, and may be accompanied with coloration. Another popular effect for flooring and table tops is polished concrete where the concrete is polished optically flat with diamond abrasives and sealed with polymers or other sealants.

Other finishes can be achieved with chiseling, or more conventional techniques such as painting or covering it with other materials.

The proper treatment of the surface of concrete, and therefore its characteristics, is an important stage in the construction and renovation of architectural structures.

Prestressed structures

Prestressed concrete is a form of reinforced concrete that builds in compressive stresses during construction to oppose tensile stresses experienced in use. This can greatly reduce the weight of beams or slabs, by
better distributing the stresses in the structure to make optimal use of the reinforcement. For example, a horizontal beam tends to sag. Prestressed reinforcement along the bottom of the beam counteracts this.
In pre-tensioned concrete, the prestressing is achieved by using steel or polymer tendons or bars that are subjected to a tensile force prior to casting, or for post-tensioned concrete, after casting.

There are two different systems being used:
 Pretensioned concrete is almost always precast, and contains steel wires (tendons) that are held in tension while the concrete is placed and sets around them.
 Post-tensioned concrete has ducts through it. After the concrete has gained strength, tendons are pulled through the ducts and stressed. The ducts are then filled with grout. Bridges built in this way have experienced considerable corrosion of the tendons, so external post-tensioning may now be used in which the tendons run along the outer surface of the concrete. In pre-tensioned concrete, the prestressing is achieved by using steel or polymer tendons or bars that are subjected to a tensile force prior to casting, or for post-tensioned concrete, after casting.

Reinforced concrete, prestressed concrete and precast concrete are the most widely used types of concrete functional extensions in modern days. For more information see Brutalist architecture.

Cold weather placement

Extreme weather conditions (extreme heat or cold; windy conditions, and humidity variations) can significantly alter the quality of concrete. Many precautions are observed in cold weather placement. Low temperatures significantly slow the chemical reactions involved in hydration of cement, thus affecting the strength development. Preventing freezing is the most important precaution, as formation of ice crystals can cause damage to the crystalline structure of the hydrated cement paste. If the surface of the concrete pour is insulated from the outside temperatures, the heat of hydration will prevent freezing.

The American Concrete Institute (ACI) definition of cold weather placement, ACI 306, is:
 A period when for more than three successive days the average daily air temperature drops below 40 °F (~ 4.5 °C), and
 Temperature stays below  for more than one-half of any 24-hour period.

In Canada, where temperatures tend to be much lower during the cold season, the following criteria are used by CSA A23.1:
 When the air temperature is ≤ 5 °C, and
 When there is a probability that the temperature may fall below 5 °C within 24 hours of placing the concrete.

CSA A 23.1 specified a compressive strength of 7.0 MPa to be considered safe for exposure to freezing.

Underwater placement 

Concrete may be placed and cured underwater. Care must be taken in the placement method to prevent washing out the cement. Underwater placement methods include the tremie, pumping, skip placement, manual placement using toggle bags, and bagwork.

Grouted aggregate is an alternative method of forming a concrete mass underwater, where the forms are filled with coarse aggregate and the voids then completely filled with pumped grout.

Roads
Concrete roads are more fuel efficient to drive on, more reflective and last significantly longer than other paving surfaces, yet have a much smaller market share than other paving solutions. Modern-paving methods and design practices have changed the economics of concrete paving, so that a well-designed and placed concrete pavement will be less expensive on initial costs and significantly less expensive over the life cycle. Another major benefit is that pervious concrete can be used, which eliminates the need to place storm drains near the road, and reducing the need for slightly sloped roadway to help rainwater to run off. No longer requiring discarding rainwater through use of drains also means that less electricity is needed (more pumping is otherwise needed in the water-distribution system), and no rainwater gets polluted as it no longer mixes with polluted water. Rather, it is immediately absorbed by the ground.

Environment, health and safety

The manufacture and use of concrete produce a wide range of environmental, economic and social impacts.

Concrete, cement and the environment
A major component of concrete is cement, a fine, soft, powdery-type substance, used mainly to bind fine sand and coarse aggregates together in concrete. Although a variety of cement types exist, the most common is “Portland cement”, which is produced by mixing clinker with smaller quantities of other additives such as gypsum and ground limestone. The production of clinker, the main constituent of cement, is responsible for the bulk of the sector's greenhouse gas emissions, including both energy intensity and process emissions.

The cement industry is one of the three primary producers of carbon dioxide, a major greenhouse gas – the other two being energy production and transportation industries. On average, every tonne of cement produced releases one tonne of CO2 into the atmosphere. Pioneer cement manufacturers have claimed to reach lower carbon intensities, with 590 kg of CO2eq per tonne of cement produced. The emissions are due to combustion and calcination processes, which roughly account for 40% and 60% of the greenhouse gases, respectively. Considering that cement is only a fraction of the constituents of concrete, it is estimated that a tonne of concrete is responsible for emitting about 100–200 kg of CO2. Every year more than 10 billion tonnes of concrete are used worldwide. In the coming years, large quantities of concrete will continue to be used, and the mitigation of CO2 emissions from the sector will be even more critical.

Concrete is used to create hard surfaces that contribute to surface runoff, which can cause heavy soil erosion, water pollution, and flooding, but conversely can be used to divert, dam, and control flooding. Concrete dust released by building demolition and natural disasters can be a major source of dangerous air pollution. Concrete is a contributor to the urban heat island effect, though less so than asphalt.

Concrete and climate change mitigation
Reducing the cement clinker content might have positive effects on the environmental life-cycle assessment of concrete. Some research work on reducing the cement clinker content in concrete has already been carried out. However, there exist different research strategies. Often replacement of some clinker for large amounts of slag or fly ash was investigated based on conventional concrete technology. This could lead to a waste of scarce raw materials such as slag and fly ash. The aim of other research activities is the efficient use of cement and reactive materials like slag and fly ash in concrete based on a modified mix design approach.

An environmental investigation found that the embodied carbon of a precast concrete facade can be reduced by 50% when using the presented fiber reinforced high performance concrete in place of typical reinforced concrete cladding.

Studies have been conducted about commercialization of low-carbon concretes. Life cycle assessment (LCA) of low-carbon concrete was investigated according to the ground granulated blast-furnace slag (GGBS) and fly ash (FA) replacement ratios. Global warming potential (GWP) of GGBS decreased by 1.1 kg CO2 eq/m3, while FA decreased by 17.3 kg CO2 eq/m3 when the mineral admixture replacement ratio was increased by 10%. This study also compared the compressive strength properties of binary blended low-carbon concrete according to the replacement ratios, and the applicable range of mixing proportions was derived.

Researchers at University of Auckland are working on utilizing biochar in concrete applications to reduce carbon emissions during concrete production and to improve strength.

Concrete and climate change adaptation
High-performance building materials will be particularly important for enhancing resilience, including for flood defenses and critical-infrastructure protection. Risks to infrastructure and cities posed by extreme weather events are especially serious for those places exposed to flood and hurricane damage, but also where residents need protection from extreme summer temperatures. Traditional concrete can come under strain when exposed to humidity and higher concentrations of atmospheric CO2. While concrete is likely to remain important in applications where the environment is challenging, novel, smarter and more adaptable materials are also needed.

Concrete – health and safety

Grinding of concrete can produce hazardous dust. Exposure to cement dust can lead to issues such as silicosis, kidney disease, skin irritation and similar effects. The U.S. National Institute for Occupational Safety and Health in the United States recommends attaching local exhaust ventilation shrouds to electric concrete grinders to control the spread of this dust. In addition, the Occupational Safety and Health Administration (OSHA) has placed more stringent regulations on companies whose workers regularly come into contact with silica dust. An updated silica rule, which OSHA put into effect 23 September 2017 for construction companies, restricted the amount of breathable crystalline silica workers could legally come into contact with to 50 micro grams per cubic meter of air per 8-hour workday. That same rule went into effect 23 June 2018 for general industry, hydraulic fracturing and maritime. That the deadline was extended to 23 June 2021 for engineering controls in the hydraulic fracturing industry. Companies which fail to meet the tightened safety regulations can face financial charges and extensive penalties. The presence of some substances in concrete, including useful and unwanted additives, can cause health concerns due to toxicity and radioactivity. Fresh concrete (before curing is complete) is highly alkaline and must be handled with proper protective equipment.

Circular economy 
Concrete is an excellent material with which to make long-lasting and energy-efficient buildings. However, even with good design, human needs change and potential waste will be generated.

End-of-life: concrete degradation and waste 

Concrete can be damaged by many processes, such as the expansion of corrosion products of the steel reinforcement bars, freezing of trapped water, fire or radiant heat, aggregate expansion, sea water effects, bacterial corrosion, leaching, erosion by fast-flowing water, physical damage and chemical damage (from carbonatation, chlorides, sulfates and distillate water). The micro fungi Aspergillus alternaria and Cladosporium were able to grow on samples of concrete used as a radioactive waste barrier in the Chernobyl reactor; leaching aluminium, iron, calcium, and silicon.

Concrete may be considered waste according to the European Commission decision of 2014/955/EU for the List of Waste under the codes: 17 (construction and demolition wastes, including excavated soil from contaminated sites) 01 (concrete, bricks, tiles and ceramics), 01 (concrete), and 17.01.06* (mixtures of, separate fractions of concrete, bricks, tiles and ceramics containing hazardous substances), and 17.01.07 (mixtures of, separate fractions of concrete, bricks, tiles and ceramics other than those mentioned in 17.01.06).  It is estimated that in 2018 the European Union generated 371,910 thousand tons of mineral waste from construction and demolition, and close to 4% of this quantity is considered hazardous. Germany, France and the United Kingdom were the top three polluters with 86,412 thousand tons, 68,976 and 68,732 thousand tons of construction waste generation, respectively.

Currently, there is not an End-of-Waste criteria for concrete materials in the EU. However, different sectors have been proposing alternatives for concrete waste and re purposing it as a secondary raw material in various applications, including concrete manufacturing itself.

Reuse of concrete 
Reuse of blocks in original form, or by cutting into smaller blocks, has even less environmental impact; however, only a limited market currently exists. Improved building designs that allow for slab reuse and building transformation without demolition could increase this use. Hollow core concrete slabs are easy to dismantle and the span is normally constant, making them good for reuse.

Other cases of re-use are possible with pre-cast concrete pieces: through selective demolition, such pieces can be disassembled and collected for further use in other building sites. Studies show that back-building and remounting plans for building units (i.e., re-use of pre-fabricated concrete) is an alternative for a kind of construction which protects resources and saves energy. Especially long-living, durable, energy-intensive building materials, such as concrete, can be kept in the life-cycle longer through recycling. Prefabricated constructions are the prerequisites for constructions necessarily capable of being taken apart. In the case of optimal application in the building carcass, savings in costs are estimated in 26%, a lucrative complement to new building methods. However, this depends on several courses to be set. The viability of this alternative has to be studied as the logistics associated with transporting heavy pieces of concrete can impact the operation financially and also increase the carbon footprint of the project. Also, ever changing regulations on new buildings worldwide may require higher quality standards for construction elements and inhibit the use of old elements which may be classified as obsolete.

Recycling of concrete

Concrete recycling is an increasingly common method for disposing of concrete structures. Concrete debris were once routinely shipped to landfills for disposal, but recycling is increasing due to improved environmental awareness, governmental laws and economic benefits.

Contrary to general belief, concrete recovery is achievable – concrete can be crushed and reused as aggregate in new projects.

Recycling or recovering concrete reduces natural resource exploitation and associated transportation costs, and reduces waste landfill. However, it has little impact on reducing greenhouse gas emissions as most emissions occur when cement is made, and cement alone cannot be recycled. At present, most recovered concrete is used for road sub-base and civil engineering projects. From a sustainability viewpoint, these relatively low-grade uses currently provide the optimal outcome.

The recycling process can be done in situ, with mobile plants, or in specific recycling units. The input material can be returned concrete which is fresh (wet) from ready-mix trucks, production waste at a pre-cast production facility, Waste from construction and demolition. The most significant source is demolition waste, preferably pre-sorted from selective demolition processes.

By far the most common method for recycling dry and hardened concrete involves crushing. Mobile sorters and crushers are often installed on construction sites to allow on-site processing. In other situations, specific processing sites are established, which are usually able to produce higher quality aggregate. Screens are used to achieve desired particle size, and remove dirt, foreign particles and fine material from the coarse aggregate.

Chloride and sulfates are undesired contaminants originated from soil and weathering and can provoke corrosion problems on aluminium and steel structures. The final product, Recycled Concrete Aggregate (RCA), presents interesting properties such as: angular shape, rougher surface, lower specific gravity (20%), higher water absorption, and pH greater than 11 – this elevated pH increases the risk of alkali reactions.

The lower density of RCA usually Increases project efficiency and improve job cost – recycled concrete aggregates yield more volume by weight (up to 15%). The physical properties of coarse aggregates made from crushed demolition concrete make it the preferred material for applications such as road base and sub-base. This is because recycled aggregates often have better compaction properties and require less cement for sub-base uses. Furthermore, it is generally cheaper to obtain than virgin material.

Applications of recycled concrete aggregate 
The main commercial applications of the final recycled concrete aggregate are:
 Aggregate base course (road base), or the untreated aggregates used as foundation for roadway pavement, is the underlying layer (under pavement surfacing) which forms a structural foundation for paving. To this date this has been the most popular application for RCA due to technical-economic aspects.
 Aggregate for ready-mix concrete, by replacing from 10 to 45% of the natural aggregates in the concrete mix with a blend of cement, sand and water. Some concept buildings are showing the progress of this field. Because the RCA contains cement it, the ratios of the mix have to be adjusted to achieve desired structural requirements such as workability, strength and water absorption.
 Soil Stabilization, with the incorporation of recycled aggregate, lime, or fly ash into marginal quality subgrade material used to enhance the load bearing capacity of that subgrade.
 Pipe bedding: serving as a stable bed or firm foundation in which to lay underground utilities. Some countries' regulations prohibit the use of RCA and other construction and demolition wastes in filtration and drainage beds due to potential contamination with chromium and pH-value impacts.
 Landscape Materials: to promote green architecture. To date, recycled concrete aggregate has been used as boulder/stacked rock walls, underpass abutment structures, erosion structures, water features, retaining walls, and more.

Cradle-to-cradle challenges 

The applications developed for RCA so far are not exhaustive, and many more uses are to be developed as regulations, institutions and norms find ways to accommodate construction and demolition waste as secondary raw materials in a safe and economic way. However, considering the purpose of having a circularity of resources in the concrete life cycle, the only application of RCA that could be considered as recycling of concrete is the replacement of natural aggregates on concrete mixes. All the other applications would fall under the category of downcycling. It is estimated that even near complete recovery of concrete from construction and demolition waste will only supply about 20% of total aggregate needs in the developed world.

The path towards circularity goes beyond concrete technology itself, depending on multilateral advances in the cement industry, research and development of alternative materials, building design and management, and demolition as well as conscious use of spaces in urban areas to reduce consumption.

World records
The world record for the largest concrete pour in a single project is the Three Gorges Dam in Hubei Province, China by the Three Gorges Corporation. The amount of concrete used in the construction of the dam is estimated at 16 million cubic meters over 17 years. The previous record was 12.3 million cubic meters held by Itaipu hydropower station in Brazil.

The Polavaram dam works in Andhra Pradesh on 6 January 2019 entered the Guinness World Records by pouring 32,100 cubic metres of concrete in 24 hours. The world record for the largest continuously poured concrete raft was achieved in August 2007 in Abu Dhabi by contracting firm Al Habtoor-CCC Joint Venture and the concrete supplier is Unibeton Ready Mix. The pour (a part of the foundation for the Abu Dhabi's Landmark Tower) was 16,000 cubic meters of concrete poured within a two-day period. The previous record, 13,200 cubic meters poured in 54 hours despite a severe tropical storm requiring the site to be covered with tarpaulins to allow work to continue, was achieved in 1992 by joint Japanese and South Korean consortiums Hazama Corporation and the Samsung C&T Corporation for the construction of the Petronas Towers in Kuala Lumpur, Malaysia.

The world record for largest continuously poured concrete floor was completed 8 November 1997, in Louisville, Kentucky by design-build firm EXXCEL Project Management. This surpassed the previous record by 50% in total volume and 7.5% in total area.

The record for the largest continuously placed underwater concrete pour was completed 18 October 2010, in New Orleans, Louisiana by contractor C. J. Mahan Construction Company, LLC of Grove City, Ohio. The placement consisted of 10,251 cubic yards of concrete placed in 58.5 hours using two concrete pumps and two dedicated concrete batch plants.

See also

Further reading

References

External links 
 
 Advantage and Disadvantage of Concrete
 

 
Building materials
Masonry
Pavements
Sculpture materials
Composite materials
Heterogeneous chemical mixtures
Roofing materials